
Year 542 (DXLII) was a common year starting on Wednesday (link will display the full calendar) of the Julian calendar. From this year forward, the appointment of particular Roman consuls was abandoned and the office was merged with that of Byzantine emperor. Thus, the consular year dating was abandoned in practice, even though it formally remained until the end of the 9th century. The denomination 542 for this year has been used since the early medieval period, when the Anno Domini calendar era became the prevalent method in Europe for naming years.

Events 
 By place 
 Byzantine Empire 
 Plague of Justinian: Bubonic plague, spread from Egypt, kills at least 230,000 in Constantinople (before counting stops), and perhaps two million or more in the rest of the empire. Emperor Justinian I contracts the disease but recovers.
 Lazic War – Justinian I sends a Byzantine army (30,000 men) to Armenia. The Persians, severely outnumbered, are forced to retreat, but at Dvin the Byzantines are defeated by a force of 4,000 men in an ambush, and are completely routed.
The 542 Sea of Marmara earthquake takes place in the winter of 542, in the vicinity of the Sea of Marmara. It also affects the coasts of Thrace and the Edremit Gulf.

 Europe 
 Spring – Battle of Faventia: King Totila scatters the Byzantine forces near Faventia (modern Faenza) with 5,000 men, beginning the resurgence of Gothic resistance to the reconquest of Italy.
 Battle of Mucellium: Totila marches down into Tuscany and defeats the Byzantines at Florence, in the valley of Mugello. He treats his prisoners well, and many are induced to join his banner.
 March – Totila bypasses Rome and begins his expedition in Southern Italy. He captures Beneventum and receives the submission of the provinces of Apulia, Lucania and Bruttium.
 Siege of Naples: Totila besieges the city of Naples in Campania. A Byzantine relief force from Sicily is intercepted and almost destroyed by Gothic warships.
 King Childebert I and his brother Chlothar I invade Visigothic Spain. They capture Pamplona, but Zaragoza withstands a siege and the Franks retreat to Gaul. From this expedition Childebert brings back to Paris a relic, the tunic of Saint Vincent.

 By topic 
 Religion 
 Brendan establishes a monastic settlement on Eileach an Naoimh (approximate date).

 Literature 
 Gildas, British monk, writes his work "De Excidio et Conquestu Britanniae" (approximate date).

Births 
 Su Wei, high official of the Sui Dynasty (d. 623)
 Xiao Min Di, emperor of Northern Zhou (d. 557)
 Xiao Ming Di, emperor of the Liang Dynasty (d. 585)

Deaths 
 August 27 – Caesarius, bishop of Arles
 Eógan Bél, king of Connacht (Ireland)

References

Sources